Fort Benning Main Post Cemetery is a military cemetery at Fort Benning in Georgia. Over 10,000 United States Army soldiers and their dependents have been interred at the 8.38-acre facility since it was established in 1922.

The first recorded interment occurred on 13 December 1922. Other burials at the cemetery include forty-four German and seven Italian prisoners of war who died at nearby detention camps during World War II, as well as four allied Chinese pilots. As of July 2022, there are three Medal of Honor recipients and twenty general officers interred at the cemetery.

Notable burials

Medal of Honor recipients
 SP4 Donald R. Johnston
 COL Robert B. Nett
 COL Edward R. Schowalter Jr.

Other burials
 BG Marcus B. Bell
 LTG William B. Caldwell III
 CSM Edward Crook Jr.
 MAJ Myron Diduryk
 LTG Harold G. Moore Jr. and his wife Julia Compton Moore
 CSM Basil L. Plumley
 MG George D. Shea
 LTG George R. Stotser
 MG Thomas M. Tarpley
 LTG Robert L. Wetzel

References

Military cemeteries in the United States
1922 establishments in Georgia (U.S. state)